The 2018 United States House of Representatives elections in Texas were held on Tuesday, November 6, 2018. Voters elected the 36 U.S. representatives from the state of Texas, one from each of the state's 36 congressional districts. The elections coincided with the elections of other offices, including the gubernatorial election, as well as other elections to the House of Representatives, elections to the United States Senate and various state and local elections. The primaries were held on March 6 and the run-offs were held on May 22.

In 2018, for the first time in at least 25 years, the Texas Democratic Party fielded at least one candidate in each of the state's 36 congressional districts. The state congressional delegation changed from a 25–11 Republican majority to a 23–13 Republican majority, the most seats that Democrats have won in the state since 2006. Democrats won almost 47% of the vote, likely due to the down-ballot effect of Representative Beto O'Rourke's Senate candidacy, in which he won 48.3% of the vote, but also because four Democrat incumbents faced no Republican opposition in their general elections.

Turnout was also more than doubled from the last midterm election.

Results summary

Statewide

District
Results of the 2018 United States House of Representatives elections in Texas by district:

District 1 

The first district is located in East Texas, including Deep East Texas, and takes in Longview, Lufkin, and Tyler.

The incumbent is Republican Louie Gohmert, who has held the seat since 2005. He was reelected with 73.9% of the vote in 2016. Roshin Rowjee, a physician, is running for the Republican nomination. Brent Beal, a college professor, is running for the Democratic nomination. Its Partisan Voter Index is R+25.

Primary results

General election

Results

District 2 

This district is located in Greater Houston, including parts of northern and western Houston, as well as Humble, Kingwood, and Spring. The PVI is R+11.

The current representative is Dan Crenshaw.

Primary results

Runoff results

General election

Polling

Results

District 3 

The 3rd district is located in the Dallas–Fort Worth metroplex, including the Dallas suburbs of Frisco, McKinney, and Plano. The incumbent representative was Sam Johnson, a Republican who has held the seat since 1991. Johnson was reelected with 61.2% of the vote in 2016. Johnson is not standing for reelection, and several candidates have announced their candidacies to replace him. The PVI of the third district is R+13.

Primary results

Runoff results

Libertarian District Convention
Declared
 Christopher Claytor
 Scott Jameson

Results
Christopher Claytor was declared the nominee by defeating Scott Jameson at the Collin County Libertarian Party Convention on Saturday, March 17.

Independents
Declared
 Roger Barone
 Robert Mason (Humane Party)

Notes

General election

Results

District 4 

The 4th district is located in Northern and Northeastern Texas, including Paris, Sherman, and Texarkana. The incumbent was Republican John Ratcliffe, who has served since 2015. He was reelected in 2016 with 88.0%, facing no Democratic opponent. The PVI of the district is R+28, making it one of the most conservative districts in the nation.

Primary results

Libertarian District Convention
Declared
 Ken Ashby

General election

Results

District 5 

The 5th district stretches from the eastern Dallas suburbs, including Mesquite, down into East Texas including Athens and Palestine. At the 2000 census, the 5th district  represented 651,620 people. The Representative from District 5 was Jeb Hensarling, who has served since 2003. He was reelected in 2016 with 80.6% of the vote, facing no Democratic opponent. The PVI of this district is R+16. Hensarling announced in October 2017 that he is going to retire from Congress, and not seek re-election to another term in 2018.

Primary results

Runoff results

Libertarian District Convention
Declared
 Ben Leder

General election

Results

District 6 

The 6th district is located in the Dallas–Fort Worth metroplex, including parts of Arlington, as well as Dalworthington Gardens and Mansfield. The district also stretches southward taking in Corsicana and Ennis. Representative from District 6 was Republican Joe Barton, who has served since 1985. Barton was reelected with 58.3% of the vote in 2016. The PVI of the sixth district is R+9. In November 2017, Barton announced that he would not run for re-election in 2018.

Primary results

Runoff results

Libertarian District Convention
Declared
 Jason Allen Harber

General election

Polling

Results

District 7 

The 7th district includes parts of western Houston and Bellaire. The incumbent representative was John Culberson, who had served the district since 2001. He was reelected in 2016 with 56.2% of the vote. The PVI for the district is R+7.

Republican primary

Declared 
John Culberson, incumbent
Edward Ziegler, business owner and consultant

Democratic primary

Advanced to runoff
Lizzie Fletcher, attorney and activist
Laura Moser, editor and journalist

Declared
Lizzie Fletcher, attorney and activist
Laura Moser, editor and journalist
Jason Westin, physician
Alex Triantaphyllis, attorney and organizer
Ivan Sanchez, senior congressional liaison
Joshua Butler, business analyst, community relations representative, and pharmaceutical sales representative
James Cargas, nominee for this seat in 2012, 2014 and 2016

Primary results

Runoff results

General election

Polling

Results

District 8 

The 8th district includes much of the northern suburbs of Houston, such as Conroe, Huntsville, and The Woodlands.  The incumbent Representative from District 8 was Republican Kevin Brady and has been since 1997. Brady was reelected in 2016 unopposed. The PVI for this district is R+28. A Democrat and an independent are running for this seat.

Primary results

Libertarian District Convention
Declared
 Bert Aguin
 Chris Duncan

Independent candidates
 Todd Carlton, crop consultant

General election

Endorsements

Results

District 9 

The 9th district serves the southwestern portion of the Greater Houston area including parts of Missouri City and Sugar Land.  The current Representative for the district, since 2005, is Democrat Al Green. Green was reelected with 80.6% of the vote in 2016. The PVI for this district is D+28.

Primary results

Libertarian District Convention
Declared
 Phil Kurtz

General election

Endorsements

Results

District 10 

The 10th district includes portions of northern Austin and its suburbs, such as Manor and Pflugerville.  The district stretches eastward into rural areas of Central Texas and the outer suburbs of Houston, including Cypress, Katy, and Tomball. The current representative is Michael McCaul, who has served since 2005. McCaul was reelected with 57.3% of the vote in 2016. The district's PVI is R+9.

Republican primary
Michael McCaul, incumbent
John W. Cook, attorney

Democratic primary

In the Democratic primary, Mike Siegel and Tawana Cadien advanced to the runoff, where Siegel ultimately prevailed. Siegel refused all corporate PAC donations.

Declared 
Mike Siegel, Austin Assistant Attorney General, and attorney
Matt Harris, data scientist and project manager
Madeline Eden, businesswoman, engineer, and architect
Tawana Cadien, consultant, registered nurse, MMA Surgery supervisor, quality assurance director, and a perennial candidate
Tami Walker, accountant and activist
Kevin Nelson, college instructor and publisher
Richie DeGrow, business manager and consultant

Primary results

Runoff results

Libertarian District Convention
Declared
 Bill Kelsey
 Mike Ryan

General election
In the general election, McCaul won against Siegel by 4.3 percent of the vote, the closest contest McCaul has faced. The outcome was notable in a district political experts rate as “Heavily Republican.”

Polling
{| class="wikitable"
|- valign= bottom
! Poll source
! Date(s)administered
! Samplesize
! Margin oferror
! style="width:100px;"| MichaelMcCaul (R)
! style="width:100px;"| MikeSiegel (D)
! Undecided
|-
| Blink Insights (D-Siegel)
| align=center| July 31 – August 4, 2018
| align=center| 524
| align=center| ± 4.3%
|  align=center| 39%
| align=center| 36%
| align=center| –

Results

District 11 

The 11th district is located in the Concho Valley including Midland, Odessa, and San Angelo. The incumbent representative was Mike Conaway, who had served since 2005. Conaway was reelected with 89.5% of the vote in 2016, without a Democratic opponent. The PVI is R+32, making this one of the most Republican districts in the country.

Primary results

Libertarian District Convention
Declared
 Nicholas Landholt
 Rhett Rosenquest Smith

General election

Results

District 12 

The 12th district is centered around Fort Worth and the surrounding suburbs including North Richland Hills, Weatherford, and White Settlement. The current Representative from District 12 is Republican Kay Granger, who has served since 1997. Granger was reelected with 69.4% of the vote in 2016. The district's PVI is R+18. One Democrat is running for the seat.

Primary results

Libertarian District Convention
Declared
 Jacob Leddy

General election

Polling

Results

District 13 

The 13th district includes most of the Texas Panhandle, parts of Texoma and northeastern parts of North Texas. It winds across the Panhandle into the South Plains, then runs east across the Red River Valley. The principal cities in the district are Amarillo and Wichita Falls. The incumbent representative was Mac Thornberry, serving since 1995. He was reelected with 90.0% of the vote, without facing a Democratic candidate. The thirteenth's district PVI is R+33, making it the most Republican district in the country.

Republican primary

Libertarian District Convention
Declared
 Calvin DeWeese

General election

Results

District 14 

The 14th district covers the Gulf Coast area of Texas, including Beaumont, Galveston, and League City. Republican Randy Weber is the incumbent, serving since 2013. He was reelected with 61.9% of the vote in 2016. The district's PVI is R+12. The sole Democratic candidate to declare candidacy, Adrienne Bell, was endorsed by Brand New Congress.

Primary results

Libertarian District Convention
Declared
 Don E. Conley III

General election

Endorsements

Results

District 15 

The 15th district stretches from parts of South Texas including Edinburg, Hebbronville, and McAllen, to the northeastern suburbs of San Antonio such as Schertz and Seguin.  The district's current Representative is Democrat Vicente González, elected in 2016. González was elected with 57.3% of the vote. The district's PVI is D+7.

Primary results

Libertarian District Convention
Declared
 Anthony Cristo
 Ross Lynn Leone

General election

Results

District 16 

The 16th district is centered around El Paso and the surrounding areas.  The Representative from District 16 was Democrat Beto O'Rourke, serving since 2013. O'Rourke was reelected with 85.7% of the vote in 2016, without facing a Republican candidate. O'Rourke retired from his seat to challenge Senator Ted Cruz in the state's 2018 Senate election, in which O’Rourke was narrowly defeated by Cruz. The district's PVI is D+17.

Primary results

General election

Results

District 17 

The 17th district is located in Central Texas including the Bryan-College station metro, Waco, and stretches to parts of North Austin. The district was represented by Republican Bill Flores, who had served since 2011. Flores was reelected with 60.8% of the vote in 2016. The district's PVI is R+12. Three Democrats are currently running for the seat.

Primary results

Libertarian District Convention
Declared
 Nicholas Becker
 Peter Churchman

General election

Polling

Results

District 18 

The 18th district is centered on inner Houston and the surrounding area.  It has been the Downtown Houston district since 1973. The current Representative from District 18 is Democratic Sheila Jackson Lee, serving since 1995. Jackson Lee won re-election in 2016 with 73.5%. The district's PVI D+27.

Primary results

Libertarian County Convention
Declared
 Luke Spencer

General election

Results

District 19 

The 19th district is located in upper rural West Texas, including Abilene, Lubbock, and Plainview. The current Representative from the 19th District is Republican Jodey Arrington, serving since 2017. Arrington was elected 86.7% of the vote in 2016, without a Democratic opponent. The district's PVI is R+27.

Primary results

General election

Results

District 20 

The 20th district is centered on the western half of San Antonio and the surrounding inner suburbs including Balcones Heights and Helotes. The incumbent representative is a Democrat Joaquín Castro, serving since 2013. He was reelected in 2016 with 79.7% of the vote without a Republican opponent.

Primary results

Libertarian County Convention
Declared
 Chuck Pena
 Jeffrey Blunt
 Michael "Commander" Idrogo

General election

Results

District 21 

The 21st district starts in the San Antonio metro, including parts of north San Antonio and New Braunfels, extending into the Austin metro, taking in parts of San Marcos and south Austin. The Representative then was Republican Lamar Smith, serving since 1987, and reelected with 57.0% of the vote in 2016. The district's PVI was R+10.

In November 2017, Smith announced that he would retire at the end of his current term, and not seek re-election in 2018. Run-off debates were held on April 12 after the primary, one hour each for the two Democratic candidates (audio) and the two Republican candidates (audio).

Republican primary
Chip Roy and Matt McCall advanced to the runoff.

Chip Roy, attorney, congressional aide
Matt McCall, small business owner, businessman, 2014 and 2016 republican candidate for TX-21
William Negley, non-profit founder, organizer, CIA intelligence officer, congressional aide
Jason Issac, consultant, business owner
Jenifer Sarver, businesswoman, congressional aide, former Department of Commerce official
Robert Stovall, former Chair of the Bexar County Republican Party, chemist, financial advisor
Susan Narvaiz, former mayor of San Marcos, Texas, businesswoman, former president and CEO Core Strategies, Inc.
Peggy Wardlaw, businesswoman and rancher
Francisco Canseco, banker, attorney, former U.S. Representative for Texas's 23rd congressional district (2011–2013)
Al Poteet, businessman, US Army veteran
Ryan Krause, businessman
Samuel Temple, psychologist, AT&T staffer
Anthony White
Eric Burkart, CIA officer, author, community planner, organizer
Mauro Garza, business owner, scientist
Foster Hagen
Autry Pruitt, political commentator, author, activist
Ivan Andarza, immigration attorney

Primary results

Democratic primary 
Mary Street Wilson and Joseph Kopser advanced to the runoff.

Mary Street Wilson, pastor, teacher, math professor, social justice activist
Joseph Kopser, aerospace engineer, US Military Veteran, businessman, entrepreneur
Derrick Crowe, businessman, non-profit founder, congressional aide
Elliott McFadden, businessman, Peace Corps member, former Executive Director of the Travis County Democratic Party, consultant, former Executive at AustinCarShare, Austin B-Cycle executive director, communications coordinator

Runoff results

Libertarian District Convention
Declared
 Gil Robinson
 Lee Santos
 Mark Loewe

General election

Polling

Results

District 22 

The 22nd district is located Greater Houston taking in suburban areas of Friendswood, Pearland, and Sugar Land. The district is currently represented by Republican Pete Olson, serving since 2009. Olson was reelected with 59.5% of the vote in 2016. The district's PVI is R+10.

Primary results

Runoff results

Libertarian District Convention
Declared
 John B. McElligott

General election

Results

District 23 

The 23rd district stretches from rural Southwestern Texas, including Alpine, Del Rio, and Socorro, into the Greater San Antonio area, taking in Hondo and the outer areas of San Antonio. It is a prominently Hispanic-majority district and its representative was Republican Will Hurd, serving since 2015. His opponent in November 2018 was Democrat Gina Ortiz Jones of San Antonio.

Gina Ortiz Jones conceded the race on November 19, 2018, after losing by around 1,150 votes.

Hurd was narrowly reelected in 2016, with 48.7% of the vote. The district's PVI is R+1.

Primary results

Runoff results

Libertarian district convention
Declared
 Ruben Corvalan

General election

Endorsements

Polling

Results

District 24 

The 24th district is centered around Mid-Cities suburbs of the Dallas–Fort Worth metroplex including Bedford, Carrollton, and Euless. The incumbent representative was Republican Kenny Marchant, serving since 2005. Marchant won reelection in 2016 with 56.2% of the vote. The PVI is R+9.

Primary results

Libertarian District Convention
Declared
 Emmanuel Lewis
 Mike Kolls
 Roland Rangel

General election

Results

District 25 

The 25th district stretches from the outer suburbs of Fort Worth, including Burleson and Cleburne down into rural Central Texas, and takes in the Austin exurbs of Dripping Springs, Lakeway, West Lake Hills, as well as parts of downtown Austin.  The current Representative from District 25 is Republican Roger Williams, serving since 2013. Williams was reelected with 58.4% of the vote in 2016. The district has a PVI of R+11.

Primary results

Runoff results

Libertarian District Convention
Declared
 Desarae Lindsey

General election

Results

District 26 

The 26th district is centered on the northern Dallas–Fort Worth suburbs, including Denton, Keller, and Lewisville.  The current Representative is Republican Michael C. Burgess, serving since 2003. Burgess was reelected in 2016 with 66.4% of the vote. The district's PVI is R+18.

Burgess is running for reelection. He is being challenged in the Republican primary by Veronica Birkenstock. Four Democrats and a Libertarian are also running.

Primary results

Libertarian District Convention
Declared
Mark Boler, Libertarian nominee in TX-26 in 2012, 2014 and 2016

General election

Results

District 27 

The 27th district is located in the Coastal Bend, anchored by Corpus Christi, and the surrounding areas including Port Aransas and Victoria.  The most recent representative was Republican Blake Farenthold, who served from 2011 until April 2018. Farenthold was reelected with 61.7% of the vote in 2016, and the district's PVI is R+13. Farenthold retired from Congress and did not run for re-election in 2018. Farenthold resigned on April 6, 2018. Michael Cloud, the Republican nominee for the general election, won a June 30 special election to fill the remainder of the term.

Primary results

Runoff results

Libertarian District Convention
Declared
 Daniel Tinus

General election

Results

District 28 

The 28th district starts in parts of the Rio Grande Valley, including Laredo, Mission and Rio Grande City and stretches north into the San Antonio suburbs including Converse and Live Oak.  The current Representative from District 28 is Democrat Henry Cuellar, who has served since 2005. Cuellar was reelected in 2016 with 66.2% of the vote. The district's PVI is D+9.

Primary results

Libertarian District Convention
Declared
 Arthur M. Thomas IV

General election

Results

District 29 

The 29th district is anchored by parts of Houston and the surrounding suburbs including Pasadena and South Houston.  The current Representative from District 29 was Democrat Gene Green, who had served since 1993. Green was reelected with 72.5% of the vote in 2016. The district's PVI is D+19.

In November 2017, Green announced that would not run for re-election in 2018. After Green's announcement, Democrats Sylvia Garcia, member of the Texas Senate for the 6th district, Armando Walle, member of the Texas House of Representatives for the 140th district, teacher Hector Morales and Republicans Adrian Garcia, the former Sheriff of Harris County, and businessman Robert Schafranek all announced their candidacy for the seat.

Primary results

Runoff results

Libertarian County Convention
Declared
 Cullen Burns
 Richard Saettone
 Ruben Perez

General election

Results

District 30 

The 30th district is centered around Dallas and its surrounding suburbs, including Cedar Hill and Lancaster. The current Representative from District 30 is Democrat Eddie Bernice Johnson, who has represented the district since its creation in 1993. She was reelected in 2016 with 77.9% of the vote. The district's PVI is D+29. Johnson ran for reelection.

Primary results

Libertarian County Convention
Declared
 Shawn Jones

General election

Results

District 31 

The 31st district is located in north Austin and the surrounding suburbs including Georgetown and Round Rock. The district also stretches north into Killeen and Temple. Republican John Carter has served since 2003, this district's creation. He was reelected with 58.4% of the vote in 2016. The district's PVI is R+10. Carter is running for reelection. He is being challenged in the Republican primary by Mike Sweeney. Three Democrats ran.

Primary results

Runoff results

Libertarian District Convention
Declared
 Jason Hope

General election

Endorsements

Polling

Results

District 32 

The 32nd district is centered around the northeastern inner Dallas suburbs, including Garland, Richardson, and the Park Cities. It is represented by Republican Pete Sessions, serving since 1997. He was reelected with 71.1% of the vote in 2016 without a Democratic opponent. The district's PVI is R+5, due to 2016 Democratic presidential candidate Hillary Clinton's performance in the district. In 2016, Sessions ran for reelection. Six Democrats also ran, including civil rights attorney and former NFL player Colin Allred, longtime Democratic operative Ed Meier, and former U.S. Department of Agriculture official Lilian Salerno. Allred won the Democratic nomination and the general election.

Primary results

Runoff results
The runoff election took place on May 22, 2018.

Libertarian District Convention
Declared
 Melina Baker

General election

Endorsements

Polling

Results

District 33 

The 33rd district is located in the Dallas–Fort Worth metroplex, taking in parts of Arlington, Dallas, Fort Worth, and Irving, as well as the surrounding areas, including Forest Hill and Grand Prairie. It is currently represented by Democrat Marc Veasey, and has been since the district's creation in 2013. Veasey was reelected with 73.7% of the vote in 2016. The district's PVI is D+23.

Primary results

Libertarian District Convention
Declared
 Jason Reeves

General election

Results

District 34 

The 34th district is centered around the Rio Grande Valley, including Brownsville, Harlingen, and Weslaco. It is currently represented by Democrat Filemon Vela Jr. and has been since the district's creation in 2013. Vela was reelected with 62.7% of the vote in 2016. The district's PVI is D+10.

Primary results

General election

Results

District 35 

The 35th district stretches from Downtown San Antonio up into Austin metro, including Lockhart, San Marcos, and parts of east Austin.

In March 2017, a panel of federal judges ruled that the 35th district was illegally drawn with discriminatory intent.  In August, 2017 there was another ruling that the district is unconstitutional.

The district is currently represented by Democrat Lloyd Doggett, and has been since its creation in 2013. Doggett previously represented Texas's 25th congressional district before redistricting. Doggett won reelection in 2016 with 63.1% of the vote. The district's PVI is D+15 Doggett is running for reelection.

Primary results

Libertarian District Convention
Declared
 Clark Patterson

General election

Results

District 36 

The 36th district takes in the Bay Area outer suburbs of Houston, including Baytown, Deer Park, and La Porte. The district also includes rural Southeastern Texas, such as Lumberton and Orange. It is currently represented by Republican Brian Babin, who has served since 2015. Babin was reelected in 2016 with 88.6% of the vote, without a Democratic opponent. Two Democrats have announced their candidacy, scientist/environmental consultant Jon Powell and radio and television personality Dayna Steele.

Primary results

Libertarian District Convention
Declared
 Robert Appelbaum

General election

Results

See also 

 2018 United States House of Representatives elections
 2018 United States elections

References

External links
 Candidates at Vote Smart
 Candidates at Ballotpedia
 Campaign finance at FEC
 Campaign finance at OpenSecrets

Official campaign websites of first district candidates
 Louie Gohmert (R) for Congress
 Shirley McKellar (D) for Congress

Official campaign websites of second district candidates
 Daniel Crenshaw (R) for Congress
 Todd Litton (D) for Congress

Official campaign websites of third district candidates
 Lorie Burch (D) for Congress
 Van Taylor (R) for Congress

Official campaign websites of fourth district candidates
 Catherine Krantz (D) for Congress
 John Ratcliffe (R) for Congress

Official campaign websites of fifth district candidates
 Lance Gooden (R) for Congress
 Dan Wood (D) for Congress

Official campaign websites of sixth district candidates
 Jana Lynne Sanchez (D) for Congress
 Ron Wright (R) for Congress

Official campaign websites of seventh district candidates
 John Culberson (R) for Congress
 Lizzie Pannill Fletcher (D) for Congress

Official campaign websites of eighth district candidates
 Kevin Brady (R) for Congress 
 Steven David (D) for Congress

Official campaign websites of ninth district candidates
 Al Green (D) for Congress

Official campaign websites of tenth district candidates
 Michael McCaul (R) for Congress
 Mike Siegel (D) for Congress

Official campaign websites of eleventh district candidates
 Mike Conaway (R) for Congress
 Jennie Lou Leeder (D) for Congress

Official campaign websites of twelfth district candidates
 Vanessa Adia (D) for Congress
 Kay Granger (R) for Congress

Official campaign websites of thirteenth district candidates
 Greg Sagan (D) for Congress
 Mac Thornberry (R) for Congress

Official campaign websites of fourteenth district candidates
 Adrienne Bell (D) for Congress
 Randy Weber (R) for Congress

Official campaign websites of fifteenth district candidates
 Vicente Gonález (D) for Congress
 Tim Westley (R) for Congress

Official campaign websites of sixteenth district candidates
 Veronica Escobar (D) for Congress
 Rick Seeberger (R) for Congress

Official campaign websites of seventeenth district candidates
 Bill Flores (R) for Congress
 Rick Kennedy (D) for Congress

Official campaign websites of eighteenth district candidates
 Sheila Jackson-Lee (D) for Congress
 Ava Reynero Pate (R) for Congress

Official campaign websites of nineteenth district candidates
 Jodey Arrington (R) for Congress
 Miguel Levario (D) for Congress

Official campaign websites of twentieth district candidates
 Joaquín Castro (D) for Congress

Official campaign websites of twenty-first district candidates
 Joseph Kopser (D) for Congress
 Chip Roy (R) for Congress

Official campaign websites of twenty-second district candidates
 Sri Preston Kulkarni (D) for Congress
 Pete Olson (R) for Congress

Official campaign websites of twenty-third district candidates
 Will Hurd (R) for Congress
 Gina Ortiz Jones (D) for Congress

Official campaign websites of twenty-fourth district candidates
 Kenny Marchant (R) for Congress
 Jan McDowell (D) for Congress

Official campaign websites of twenty-fifth district candidates
 Julie Oliver (D) for Congress
 Roger Williams (R) for Congress

Official campaign websites of twenty-sixth district candidates
 Mark Boler (L) for Congress
 Michael Burgess (R) for Congress
 Linsey Fagan (D) for Congress

Official campaign websites of twenty-seventh district candidates
 Michael Cloud (R) for Congress
 Eric Holguin (D) for Congress

Official campaign websites of twenty-eighth district candidates
 Henry Cuellar (D) for Congress

Official campaign websites of twenty-ninth district candidates
 Phillip Aronoff (R) for Congress
 Sylvia Garcia (D) for Congress

Official campaign websites of thirtieth district candidates
 Eddie Bernice Johnson (D) for Congress

Official campaign websites of thirty-first district candidates
 John Carter (R) for Congress
 MJ Hegar (D) for Congress

Official campaign websites of thirty-second district candidates
 Colin Allred (D) for Congress
 Pete Sessions (R) for Congress

Official campaign websites of thirty-third district candidates
 Willie Billups (R) for Congress
 Marc Veasey (D) for Congress

Official campaign websites of thirty-fourth district candidates
 Rey Gonzalez (R) for Congress
 Filemon Vela Jr. (D) for Congress

Official campaign websites of thirty-fifth district candidates
 Lloyd Doggett (D) for Congress
 David Smalling (R) for Congress

Official campaign websites of thirty-sixth district candidates
 Brian Babin (R) for Congress
 Dayna Steele (D) for Congress

2018
Texas
United States House of Representatives